Yang Yang (born 9 September 1991) is a Chinese actor. He made his acting debut in the Chinese television drama The Dream of Red Mansions (2010). Since then, he has received recognition for his roles in television dramas The Lost Tomb (2015), The Whirlwind Girl (2015), Love O2O (2016), Martial Universe (2018), The King's Avatar (2019), You Are My Glory (2021), Glory of Special Forces (2022), Who Rules The World (2022) and films The Left Ear (2015), I Belonged to You (2016), Once Upon a Time (2017).

He was ranked 5th on the 2017 Forbes China Celebrity 100 list, 27th in 2019 and 44th in 2020. He was China's first Olympic flame torch bearer for the Rio Olympic Games on Greece, April 22, 2016.

Early life
At the young age of 11, Yang was enrolled in the Department of Dance in People's Liberation Army Arts College in China. He also has studied at the Central Academy of Drama for a period of time.

Career

2007–2014: Beginning 
In December 2007, he was chosen to play the lead role Jia Baoyu by director Li Shaohong in The Dream of Red Mansions. One of the most expensive Chinese TV series produced at RMB118 million (US$17.55 million), the 50-episode drama premiered on July 6, 2010.

In 2011, Yang featured in The Founding of a Party, a patriotic tribute detailing the process of establishing the Chinese Communist Party. He continued to build up his filmography, featuring in war dramas The War Doesn't Believe in Tears (2012) and Ultimate Conquest (2013), and romance series Flowers of Pinellia Ternata (2013).

On April 29, 2014, Yang ended his contract of 7 years with his company Rosat Entertainment.

2015–2016: Rising popularity and breakthrough
In 2015, Yang started to gain recognition for his performance in The Left Ear, a coming-of-age film which is also the directorial debut of Alec Su. The film was a box-office hit, and Yang received positive for his performance as Xu Yi. 
He then participated in travel-reality show Divas Hit the Road, which was a huge topic online when it aired and helped Yang top the "2015 Chinese Reality Show Star Ranking". 
He next starred in action-adventure web-drama The Lost Tomb based on the novel of the same name. The Lost Tomb was the most watched web drama of the year, and Yang gained acclaim from novel fans and audience for his portrayal of Zhang Qiling.
Yang then played the male lead in youth sports drama The Whirlwind Girl, which gained one of the highest viewership ratings of the year. He also released his first single, "Tender Love".
At the end of the year, Yang won several awards including the Most Popular TV Actor of the Year at iQiyi All-Star Carnival Night 2016; and the Most Anticipated Actor and Most Influential Actor awards at the China TV Drama Awards.

In 2016, Yang appeared in CCTV New Year's Gala for the first time, where his song item "Father and Son" alongside Tong Tiexin was voted the most popular program. He starred in youth romance drama Love O2O, based on Gu Man's novel of the same name. The drama was an international hit, and is the most viewed modern drama in China. Following the airing of Love O2O, Yang experienced a huge surge in popularity and successfully broke into the mainstream. To thank his fans, Yang released the song "Love is Crazy", a jazz/rock single. He next starred in romance film I Belonged to You, which was a huge success and broke the box-office sales record for mainland-produced romance films. He was named as one of the Top 10 Chinese celebrities with most commercial value by CBN Weekly.

2017–present: Continued success

In 2017, Yang starred alongside Liu Yifei in romantic fantasy film Once Upon a Time.

In 2018, Yang starred in the fantasy action drama Martial Universe. Forbes China listed Yang under their 30 Under 30 Asia 2017 list which consisted of 30 influential people under 30 years old who have had a substantial effect in their fields.

In 2019, Yang played the leading role Ye Xiu in the eSports drama The King's Avatar.

In 2020, Yang starred in action movie Vanguard alongside Jackie Chan. The same year, Yang was cast in You Are My Glory alongside Dilraba Dilmurat. As a much-anticipated drama due to popularity of its original work (novel of the same name), this show has successfully gathered a total of 4 billion views worldwide. Later that year, a drama based on military genre, Glory of the Special Forces (directed by Xu Jizhou) cast him as the lead role.

In 2022, he starred in the fantasy romance drama titled Who Rules the World opposite Zhao Lusi, based on the novel by Qing Lengyue.

Other activities
In January 2016, Yang became the first artist to be featured on the China Post postage stamp.

On February 19, 2017, Yang had his wax figure displayed at Madam Tussauds Shanghai. His second wax figure was displayed at Madame Tussauds Beijing on July 19, 2017.

In December 2020, British luxury goods brand Dunhill announced Yang as its newest Global Brand Ambassador.

In September 2021, Bulgari appointed Yang as its newest spokesperson.

Endorsements 
Yang yang has 21 active endorsements per January 2023

Filmography

Film

Television series

Short film

Variety show

Music videos

Theatre

Discography

Singles

Awards and nominations

Forbes China Celebrity 100

Character evaluation
Yang Yang transformed from a dancer to an actor with The Dream of Red Mansions. His handsome appearance is clear and gentle, and his appearance is both ancient and modern. He has both a style that can adapt to modern fashion and a classic and elegant temperament (Sina review).

Yang Yang, who graduated from military art and has enlisted in the army, has a good body, plus his appearance, he can control all types of clothing freely, and his unique dressing style also shows his youthful vitality. Whether it's ancient or modern costumes, whether it's standard costumes or free wear, or even the blindfolded bangs with a slightly killing matt style in The Lost Tomb, Yang Yang relies on his long legs and good looks to be able to control freely (Xinhua Net Review).

From Jia Baoyu in his debut The Dream of Red Mansions, to Xu Yi in The Left Ear, the little master Zhang Qiling in The Lost Tomb, and the senior brother Ruo Bai in The Whirlwind Girl, each role has its own characteristics. Each is different. Yang Yang has honed his acting skills in performances time after time. He can already instill youthfulness, mystery, and seriousness into the characters in different performances. The special effects in Once Upon a Time are shaped as the preparation for the filming of the film also shows the diligent efforts of the model workers (Netease entertainment review).

As an actor, Yang Yang is deeply concerned and loved by both inside and outside the industry, and his love for his work and dedication is well recognized. He interprets every role with heart, does his job well, and interprets a good socialist youth with his true self. His seriousness and hard work have been recognized both inside and outside the industry. Yang Yang has always been keen on public welfare undertakings from the outstanding young performers of "The Flowers of May" to the "National Upgrading of Good Youths", using his influence to lead fans to take charge of public welfare, enthusiastically donating money to convey love, and influencing his surroundings through practical actions. Fans and the public at all times convey positive energy for the good and youth (Sina review).

References

External links 

 
 
 

1991 births
Living people
Male actors from Shanghai
21st-century Chinese male actors
Chinese male film actors
Chinese male television actors
People's Liberation Army Arts College alumni